Pac-Man World Rally, known in Europe as Pac-Man Rally, is a kart racing game in the Pac-Man series. It was published by Bandai Namco Games, and released on August 22, 2006, for the PlayStation 2, GameCube, PlayStation Portable, and Microsoft Windows, it was the final installment of the Pac-Man World series until 16 years later with the announcement of Pac-Man World Re-Pac. An Xbox version of the game was cancelled, though a preview of the game can be found in the Xbox release of Pac-Man World 3.

A follow-up, Pac-Man Kart Rally, was released for iOS in 2010 and Android in 2012, including a release for Fire TV.

On March 19, 2018, the sequel was delisted from all major app stores except the Fire TV app store.

Gameplay
In Pac-Man World Rally, players race as characters from the Pac-Man series and other characters from Namco's arcade games to be the first to win. On every track, there are item boxes that players pick up and use their weapons to attack their opponents or help themselves out. As a player performs a powerslide, a bar will appear next to the speedometer. Once it's full, the player will then be able to use a Guardian, which temporarily shields them from all attacks.

Additionally, there are Pac-Dots that, once collected, fill the Pac-Meter. Once its full, the player can transform into the Pac-Mobile to turn the other racers into ghosts. Once a ghost is chomped, the racer will not move for a few moments.

The main game of Pac-Man World Rally has four racing modes, two of which are exclusive to the PlayStation Portable version:
Circuit Mode: The main game where players race across four tracks for the most points.
Time Trial: A single-player mode where the player is tasked with getting the fastest time possible on the track of their choice.
Quick Race: A single race mode.
Versus: Two to four players race on a selected track without computer-controlled drivers.

In addition to racing, Pac-Man World Rally has five Battle modes, each with their own objectives:
Deathmatch: Players compete to get a specified number of kills, with them gaining a point for each opponent killed while losing one if they are killed themselves.
Free For All: Players compete for the most points within the allotted time. As with Deathmatch, players gain points for defeating their opponents and losing one if they are defeated themselves.
Last Kart Driving: Players eliminate each other to be the last one standing.
Binge: Players pick up fruit that appear in the arena and must be the one to have the most fruit when time runs out. However, if a player is defeated, they will lose half of the fruit in their possession.
Classic: Players pick up the Pac-Dots around the arena and win by having the most after the specified number of rounds. The Pac-Mobile can also be used to attack opponents.

Unlike the racing modes, Battle mode has fruit-shaped weapons that players use to attack each other. Health crates restore the damage the player took, and the Guardian crates temporarily protect them from all attacks.

Reception

The game received mixed reviews on all consoles according to review aggregator Metacritic.

References

2006 video games
Cancelled Xbox games
GameCube games
Pac-Man
PlayStation 2 games
PlayStation Portable games
Kart racing video games
Racing video games
Video games developed in the United States
Windows games